Sam Piroj Bharucha (November 1, 1936) was the 30th Chief Justice of India, serving from November 2001 until his retirement in 2002.

He began his legal career as an advocate of the Bombay High Court in 1960, and was appointed an Additional Judge in 1977. His judgeship was made permanent in 1978, and in 1991 he was appointed Chief Justice of the Karnataka High Court. In 1992, he was appointed to the Supreme Court of India, and became Chief Justice in 2001.

Bharucha is responsible for many significant legal decisions. He was part of the five judge constitutional panel which unanimously ruled on the 2001 dismissal of J. Jayalalithaa as Chief Minister of Tamil Nadu. It was the first and only such dismissal of a chief minister in India's history.

References

1937 births
Living people
Parsi people
Chief justices of India
Chief Justices of the Karnataka High Court
Gujarati people
Judges of the Bombay High Court
20th-century Indian judges
21st-century Indian judges
Presidents of the International Law Association